Code Name: Jackal (lit. "The Jackal Is Coming" or "Here Comes the Jackal") is a 2012 South Korean action comedy film, starring Song Ji-hyo, Kim Jae-joong of JYJ, and Oh Dal-su. The film was directed by Bae Hyoung-jun, whose works included Too Beautiful to Lie and Once Upon a Time. It was produced by Nomad Films and distributed by Lotte Entertainment. It was released on 15 November 2012 and ran for 105 minutes.

Summary
Clumsy and off-the-wall hit man Bong Min-jung (Song Ji-hyo) is hired to kill top Hallyu star Choi Hyun (Kim Jae-joong). The mission starts by abducting him at Paradise Hotel in Seong-ju, the place where Hyun checked in to rest and stay away from stress, and also where the cops are on a stakeout for a serial killer.

Cast
 Song Ji-hyo as Bong Min-jung, female killer
 Kim Jae-joong as Choi Hyun, a K-pop star  
 Oh Dal-su as Chief Detective Ma
 Han Sang-jin as Team Leader Shin
 Kim Sung-ryung as Angela
 Kim Yong-gun as Angela's husband
 Seo Yi An as Yoo Young Sun
 Shin Dong-mi as Seon-young

Original soundtrack
 "Healing For Myself" - Kim Jae-joong
 "Kiss B" - Kim Jae-joong
 "Stay" - Kim Jae-joong

Production
The film marks the first collaboration between Kim and Song, as well as Kim's first starring role in a big screen debut. A press conference was attended by the cast: Kim Jae-joong, Song Ji-hyo, Han Sang-jin and Oh Dal-su, held on 9 November 2012 at the Lotte Cinema at Konkuk University.

The film ranked fourth and grossed  on its first week of release, and grossed a total of  domestically after two weeks of screening.

International release
Ahead of the film's release, it was announced by its distributor Lotte Entertainment that the film has been pre-sold to six Asian countries: Japan, Thailand, Malaysia, Singapore, Indonesia and Brunei.

 Japan theatrical release: 3 May 2013
 Thailand airing on Channel 7: 7 July 2017 at 02:15

References

External links 
 
 
 

2012 films
2012 action comedy films
South Korean action comedy films
2010s crime comedy films
2010s police comedy films
Films about music and musicians
Films set in hotels
Lotte Entertainment films
2010s Korean-language films
2012 comedy films
2010s South Korean films